Dmitry Tursunov was the defending champion, but chose not to participate that year.

Richard Gasquet won in the final 6–3, 6–4, against Olivier Rochus.

Seeds

Draw

Finals

Top half

Bottom half

External links
Draw
Qualifying draw

Singles